Sams Creek may refer to:

Sams Creek (Missouri)
Sams Creek (West Virginia)